Ropica piperata is a species of beetle in the family Cerambycidae. It was described by Pascoe in 1858. It is known from Borneo and Malaysia.

References

piperata
Beetles described in 1858